Christmas is a studio album by American country singer-songwriter Bill Anderson. It was released in November 1969 on Decca Records and was produced by Owen Bradley. Christmas was Anderson's twelfth studio recording and also his first album of Christmas music. It was also his second studio album released in 1969.

Background, content and release
Christmas was recorded in October 1969 in sessions produced by Owen Bradley. It would be Anderson's twelfth studio album and twelfth to be produced by Bradley. The sessions were held at Bradley's Barn, which was a venue located in Mount Juliet, Tennessee. The album consisted of nine tracks, which was unlike his previous albums which included 11–12 songs per set. 

Nearly all of the album's tracks were cover versions of notable Christmas and holiday tunes. Among these covers was songs such as Elvis Presley's "Blue Christmas" and the traditional song "Silent Night". Also contained in the album were two medleys of holiday songs. These tracks were featured on side two of the record. Two tracks on the album were new recordings composed by Anderson himself. One of these recordings was the fifth track, "Po' Folks Christmas", a holiday version of his original country music hit, "Po' Folks".

Christmas was released on Decca Records in November 1969, his second studio effort released that year. It was released as a vinyl LP, containing six songs on side one and three on side two. Upon its release, Christmas did not make any Billboard music publication charts.

Track listing

Personnel
All credits are adapted from the liner notes of My Life/But You Know I Love You.

Musical personnel
 Bill Anderson – lead vocals
 Harold Bradley – guitar
 Dottie Dillard – background vocals
 Roy Huskey – bass
 The Jordanaires – background vocals
 Millie Kirkham – background vocals
 Jimmy Lance – guitar
 Grady Martin – guitar
 Len Miller – drums
 Hal Rugg – steel guitar
 Jerry Smith – piano, vibes
 Jimmy Woodard – organ

Technical personnel
 Owen Bradley – record producer

Release history

References

1969 Christmas albums
Albums produced by Owen Bradley
Bill Anderson (singer) albums
Christmas albums by American artists
Country Christmas albums
Decca Records albums